Roderick Nicol Matheson (May 28, 1824 – September 14, 1862) was an officer in the Union Army during the American Civil War.

Matheson was born in Inverness, Scotland, and emigrated to New York City with his parents at the age of 15. During the California Gold Rush he moved to San Francisco. In 1856 he moved to Healdsburg, California, becoming a prominent city benefactor and wealthy landowner. He traveled to Washington, D.C., for Abraham Lincoln's inauguration in 1861, intending to stay only a few weeks, but found himself swept up in the fever of approaching war.

Matheson was the colonel and commander of the 32nd Regiment of New York Volunteers, which he founded in June 1861 and which he referred to as the 1st California Regiment. He fought in the First Battle of Bull Run, the Peninsula Campaign, and the Seven Days Battles. He was mortally wounded at Crampton's Gap during the Battle of South Mountain.

Matheson is buried in Oak Mound Cemetery in Healdsburg. A major street in the town is named after him.

References

External links

People of California in the American Civil War
1824 births
1862 deaths
People from Healdsburg, California
Scottish emigrants to the United States
Military personnel from Inverness
Union Army colonels
Union military personnel killed in the American Civil War